Former Antonveneta Padova is a professional volleyball team of 
Pallavolo Padova (until 1999 Petrarca Volley, until 2009 Sempre Volley), based in Padua, Italy. It plays in Italian Volleyball League. Since 2009 it is named Pallavolo Padova and it plays Italian SuperLega in 2016–2017, the highest level of Italian volleyball. It won a CEV Cup in 1994.

Achievements
 CEV Cup / CEV Challenge Cup
  1994
  1988, 1989, 1992, 1993
  1991
 Italian Cup Serie A2
  2014

Team
Team roster – season 2022/2023

External links
 Official website
 Team profile at Volleybox.net

Italian volleyball clubs